Pia Pera (12 March 1956 – 26 July 2016) was an Italian novelist, essayist, and translator.

Born in Lucca, the daughter of the jurist Giuseppe, a noted translator of Pushkin into Italian Pera started her own writing career in 1992, with the short stories collection La bellezza dell'asino ("The Beauty of the Donkey"). She got international notoriety with her 1995 novel Lo's Diary, a retelling of  Vladimir Nabokov's novel Lolita from the point of view of the female title character. In later years she specialized in novels connected to her passion for gardening.

Pera was also a translator of Russian novels and an essayist. She was a professor of Russian literature at the University of Trento. Her last work was the semi-autobiographic novel Al giardino ancora non l’ho detto ("I haven't told my garden yet").

Pera died at 60 years old of motor neuron disease.

References

1956 births
2016 deaths
Writers from Lucca
20th-century Italian novelists
21st-century Italian novelists
20th-century Italian translators
Italian women novelists
Italian women essayists
Italian essayists
Academic staff of the University of Trento
20th-century essayists
21st-century essayists
20th-century Italian women writers
21st-century Italian women writers
Neurological disease deaths in Tuscany
Deaths from motor neuron disease